ODB (Operon DataBase) is a database of conserved operons in sequenced genomes.

See also
 Operon

References

External links
 http://operondb.jp/

Biological databases
Gene expression
Operons